Acartauchenius insigniceps is a species of sheet weaver found in Algeria, Morocco and Tunisia. It was described by Simon in 1894.

References

Linyphiidae
Spiders of North Africa
Spiders described in 1894